Moyie Dam is a dam on the Moyie River in Boundary County, Idaho.

As of 1984 Bonners Ferry was one of only three Idaho cities with its own municipally owned hydropower source, and the city ran it at a small profit returned to its general fund.

Eileen Dam 

The ruins of the 1923 version of the dam, the Old Eileen Dam , stands five miles upstream.  It's noted as one of the few concrete single-angle thin-arch dams to be breached, although it was not a structural failure.  A sudden flood in 1925 overtopped the  dam, washed out the left embankment, and left the dam shell intact.  There were no casualties.  The shell and rusting powerhouse equipment remain, posing an obstacle, and mystery, for white-water rafters.

References 

Dams in Idaho
Reservoirs in Idaho
United States local public utility dams
Buildings and structures in Boundary County, Idaho
Gravity dams
Hydroelectric power plants in Idaho
Dams completed in 1950
Energy infrastructure completed in 1921
Energy infrastructure completed in 1941
Energy infrastructure completed in 1982
Lakes of Boundary County, Idaho
1921 establishments in Idaho